Quarry Falls is a small waterfall (or perhaps large rapid in high water) located beside US Hwy. 64 west of Highlands, North Carolina, United States. It is best known for the large, deep pool at the bottom and is a popular place for swimming during warm weather. Quarry Falls is known to the locals as "Bust-Your-Butt-Falls" or “”Mud-Butt-Falls”

Nearby Falls
Dry Falls
Cullasaja Falls
Bridal Veil Falls

External links
 Quarry Falls - information and photos

Protected areas of Macon County, North Carolina
Waterfalls of North Carolina
Waterfalls of Macon County, North Carolina